Paul Herbert (born 20 December 1966) is a British former middle-distance runner who competed in the 800 metres race.

References

Living people
1964 births
British male middle-distance runners